The Pittsford Central School District is a public school district in New York State that serves approximately 5,980 students in the towns of Pittsford, Perinton, Penfield, Mendon, and Brighton in Monroe County; and Victor in Ontario County with approximately 800 employees and an operating budget in 2013–2014 of $117,251,229(~$19,607 per student).

The average class size is 20–30 students and the student-teacher ratio is 14:1 (elementary), 12:1 (middle-high school).

Centralized in 1946, the Pittsford Central School District celebrated 60 Years of Excellence in 2006. The District is one of the top school districts in the county, the state and the nation. Its programs, staff and curriculum are considered among the best available in schools anywhere.

Michael Pero is the Superintendent of Schools, who replaced Mary Alice Price in 2013. Pero previously served as the Assistant Superintendent of Human Resources and as principal of Barker Road Middle School.

The District's motto is "Excellence Today and Tomorrow".

Board of education
The Board of Education consists of seven, non-paid, elected members who reside in the Pittsford Central School District. Members serve three-year terms. Elections are held each May for board members and to vote on the School District Budget.

, board members are:
Robin Scott, Vice President
Ted Aroesty, President
Dave Berk
Emily Kay
Rene Sanchez-Kazacos
Jeffrey Casey
Sarah Pelusio
Debbie Carpenter, School District Clerk

Schools
The Pittsford Central School District operates five elementary, two middle and two high schools across the district. By convention, the district names schools for the road on which they are located.

A major remodeling and construction program was undertaken in 2004. This involved modernization of existing buildings, expansion of Sutherland High School, and the construction of the new Calkins Road Middle School. The Sutherland High School remodeling was completed in 2007, while the construction of Calkins Road Middle School was completed in time for the 2006–2007 school year.

Elementary schools
Serving grades K through 5:
Student Enrollment (2013) = 2,492
Allen Creek Elementary (ACE), Principal - Michael Biondi
Jefferson Road Elementary School (JRE), Principal - Leah Kedley
Mendon Center Elementary School (MCE), Principal - Heather Clayton
Park Road Elementary School (PRE), Principal - Mark Balsamo
Thornell Road Elementary School (TRE), Principal - Edward Foote

Middle schools
Serving grades 6 through 8:
Student Enrollment (2013) = 1,443
Barker Road Middle School (BRMS), Principal - Sarah Jacob
Calkins Road Middle School (CRMS), Principal - Joshua Walker

High schools
Serving grades 9 through 12:
Student Enrollment (2013) = 2,008
Pittsford Mendon High School (MHS), Principal - Melissa Julian
Pittsford Sutherland High School (SHS), Principal - Mark Puma

Performance
In 2013, the Pittsford Central School District was recognized as the No.1 district in upstate New York by the Albany Business Journal, as part of its Schools Report for 2013. Schools from 50 counties and 455 districts were evaluated based on a variety of factors, including graduation rates and performances on Regents exams.

The Pittsford Central School District was named as the best district among the 67 surrounding districts, for the fourth year in a row by Buffalo's Business First in 2013.

Pittsford Mendon High School and Sutherland High School were commended for their Science, Technology, Engineering and Mathematics (STEM) programs by U.S. News & World Report. Mendon was ranked nationally at No. 107 and Sutherland was ranked No. 23 (The STEM Index showed only eight points separating the two schools).

Both Mendon High School and Sutherland High School were nationally ranked in 2012 and 2013 by The Washington Post, Newsweek and U.S. News & World Report.

Mendon High School and Sutherland High School were the top two high schools among the 67 surrounding western New York districts in 2012, according to Buffalo's Business First.

In 2012, both Barker Road Middle School and Calkins Road Middle School were named as Schools to Watch.

Barker Road Middle School and Calkins Road Middle School were named as the top two middle schools among 67 western New York districts by Buffalo's Business First in 2012.

Barker Road Middle School and Calkins Road Middle School were named top two schools in the county, respectively, in 2015.

Barker Road Middle School was recognized as a Blue Ribbon School by the U.S. Department of Education in 2012.

In 2012, Allen Creek Elementary School was named a National School of Character.

All five Pittsford elementary schools were ranked in the top 20 of elementary schools in 67 western New York districts, according to Buffalo's Business First.

Pittsford students rank high academically in standard and specialized tests. More than 97% of Pittsford students graduate with an Honors diploma. A high percentage move on to college.

In June 2007, the American Music Conference recognized the district as being among the 2007 "Best 100 Communities for Music Education"

In 2007, Park Road Elementary School was named one of 287 schools in the country as a Blue Ribbon School by the United States Department of Education.

References

External links

New York State School Boards Association

School districts in New York (state)
Education in Monroe County, New York
Education in Ontario County, New York
School districts established in 1946